The discography of American country music artist Carly Pearce consists of three studio albums, one live album, one extended play, seven singles, ten promotional singles, nine music videos and 17 album appearances. Before being signed to a recording contract, Pearce contributed her vocals to several albums of bluegrass music in the 2000s. In 2016, she collaborated with the Josh Abbott Band on the single "Wasn't That Drunk". It reached number 37 on the Billboard Country Airplay chart the same year. 

Shortly thereafter, Pearce independently released the song "Every Little Thing". The song gained exposure after being featured on satellite radio, which helped her sign with Big Machine Records. Re-released through the label, "Every Little Thing" peaked at number one on the Billboard Country Airplay chart and number five on the Billboard Hot Country Songs chart in 2017. Pearce's debut album of the same name was released in October 2017, debuting at number four on the Billboard Top Country Albums chart. "Hide the Wine" was the second single spawned from her 2017 album, reaching number 13 on the Country Airplay chart in 2018.

In 2018, Pearce released her third single entitled "Closer to You". Spending nearly a year on the Billboard country charts, it reached minor positions including the Hot Country Songs chart where it reached number 33. Later in 2019, she issued a duet single with Lee Brice entitled "I Hope You're Happy Now". Becoming a major hit on the Billboard country charts, Pearce released her self-titled second studio album in February 2020. The album debuted at number 6 on the Top Country Albums chart and at number 73 on the Billboard 200. In September 2021, Pearce released her third studio album entitled "29: Written in Stone" featuring the lead single, "Next Girl" and second single, "Never Wanted to Be That Girl" featuring Ashley McBryde. The album debuted at number 9 on the Top Country Albums chart and number 83 on the Billboard 200.

Albums

Studio albums

Live albums

Extended plays

Singles

As lead artist

As a featured artist

Promotional singles

Music videos

Other album appearances

Notes

References

External links
 Carly Pearce discography at Discogs

Discographies of American artists
Country music discographies